Microryzomys is a genus of rodent in the tribe Oryzomyini of family Cricetidae. It is closely related to Oreoryzomys, Oligoryzomys, and Neacomys. It contains two species, both restricted to the Andes: M. altissimus and M. minutus.

Characteristics
They have small hind feet with six fleshy pads on the under surface, and with the fifth toe nearly as long as the middle three. The four pairs of mammae are arranged in the typical fashion for members of the tribe. At one time, this genus was considered to be a subgenus of Oryzomys, but Carleton and Musser (1989) raised it to full generic status on the basis of various anatomic details of skull and dentition and on certain morphological traits.

Distribution
Microryzomys is found in high mountainous areas of western South America. The range of the genus extends from the Caribbean coastal ranges and the Cordillera de Mérida of Venezuela, through the Cordillera Occidental, Cordillera Central and Cordillera Oriental of Colombia, to the Andes ranges of Ecuador, Peru and Bolivia. This is also the range of M. minutus, because M. altissimus occurs only in the higher parts of this range and is limited to Colombia, Ecuador and Peru.

References

Literature cited
Weksler, M. 2006. Phylogenetic relationships of oryzomyine rodents (Muroidea: Sigmodontinae): separate and combined analyses of morphological and molecular data. Bulletin of the American Museum of Natural History 296:1–149.

 
Páramo fauna
Rodent genera
Taxa named by Oldfield Thomas
Taxonomy articles created by Polbot